Lane is an unincorporated community in Kootenai County, Idaho, United States. Lane is located along the Coeur d'Alene River and Idaho State Highway 3. The community was founded as a lumber town in the 1880s and named after a logger.

History
Lane's population was estimated at 200 in 1909.

References

Unincorporated communities in Kootenai County, Idaho
Unincorporated communities in Idaho